Jazz Jackrabbit is a 1994 platform game developed and published by Epic MegaGames. It was released for MS-DOS-based computers. On November 30, 2017, the game was re-released on GOG.com along with Jazz Jackrabbit 2, with support for Windows, macOS, and Linux.

Gameplay

Jazz Jackrabbit is a 2D platform game. The game is divided into six episodes. Each episode has three planets (worlds), with every planet itself consisting of two levels (some planets have an additional secret level). The final level of every episode features a boss that the player must deal with in order to complete the level. Episodes are tied by a single storyline usually progressing after each episode is finished.

Gameplay mechanics in Jazz are very similar to Zool'''s, with the exception of not being able to destroy the enemies by simply jumping at them (which was not added until the second game). Jazz will run faster and jump higher the longer he runs, avoiding chasms that might lead to harmful objects. Unlike other platform games, however, there are no abysses and every level bifurcates into subsections that might lead to valuable items (such as weapon pick-ups, score items, etc.) while the direction of general progression is hinted at with occasional arrows. Jazz has a life bar that changes in colour based on how much health Jazz has remaining. Jazz can withstand a limited number of hits (5 on Easy mode, 4 on Medium mode, 3 on Hard or Turbo mode) from harmful objects before losing a life; one hit's worth of health can be restored by picking up a carrot. Lives can also be accumulated to the maximum number of ten. When killed, Jazz starts from the level beginning or at any checkpoint sign that had been reached and shot before.

Items that the player can pick up usually resemble food, computer hardware components or other familiar shapes, and give 100 score points each. There are also several beneficial pick-ups in the game: a "force shield" that protects Jazz from one or four hits, a Hip Hop that shoots enemies, a hoverboard that allows flight, rapid fire/super jump bonuses, a temporary "speed-up" and invincibility, as well as extra lives. Weapons also vary in numbers and consistency and include (besides the Blaster) Bouncer, Toaster, RF Missile, and TNT sets. Large sets of ammunition can only be collected by being shot from their enclosure.

The first game has a timer that starts a number of minutes at the beginning of each level (9 minutes and 59 seconds on Easy mode, 8 minutes on Medium, 6 minutes on Hard, and 4 minutes on Turbo) and counts down to zero; on Hard and Turbo, another countdown appears at the top of the screen when there is less than a minute left, and if time expires, Jazz loses a life. If Jazz reaches and shoots the finish sign before time runs out, the player is then provided with additional score points awarded for the remaining time and a perfect score if he picks up all items and/or deals with all enemies. If Jazz finishes the area with a big red diamond, he gets to enter the bonus stage. In these stages, animation switches to a pseudo-3D (third-person shooter) of Jazz as he runs on a speedway with the purpose of gathering as many blue diamonds as requested before time runs out, while obstacles try to stop him or slow him down. If the task is accomplished successfully, the player is provided with an extra life.

Aside from bonuses, Jazz also features secret levels that can be accessed in specific areas of other levels once in every episode. Secret level signs feature the question mark instead of Devan's head portrait that must be shot. The current level is then considered completed and the secret level embarks. Levels themselves consist of an enormous "grant" area with numerous weapons and items to pick up. One level, however, features a mini-boss, while the player assumes control of Jazz in his sidekick bird form. Secret levels also feature a count-up upon completion that provides the player with extra score points.

Plot
The game is set in a fantasy world based on Aesop's "The Tortoise and the Hare", in which the enmity between tortoises and hares continues even after three thousand years. An evil mastermind tortoise named Devan Shell begins conquering planets, suppressing any native confrontation. One of such planets, Carrotus, is home to a peaceful hare kingdom that, once confronted by Shell, is able to provide enough resistance to fend him off. Enraged by his loss, Devan decides to kidnap Carrotus princess Eva Earlong and hide her on a distant airbase of unknown location to weaken the hares. In response, the king chooses to send Carrotus' hero Jazz Jackrabbit, who carries a blue LFG-2000 gun, to various planets conquered by Devan that might contain clues to the location of Eva's imprisonment. As Jazz travels through different worlds, he gains new weapons and meets new enemies in his pursuit to rescue the princess and save Carrotus from Devan Shell and his army of Turtle Terrorists.

Jazz is depicted as a bright green hare with a red bandana, bracers and a blue "blaster" gun.

DevelopmentJazz Jackrabbit was coded by Arjan Brussee and designed by Cliff Bleszinski for Epic MegaGames. It was greatly inspired by the Amiga game Zool and the ongoing success of video game classics (such as Sonic the Hedgehog and Mega Man) defining the platform game genre in the 1990s market, and was initially considered to be a pastiche of Sega's Sonic the Hedgehog in the computer world. The game did not manage to reach the popularity of Sonic, but did acquire a sizable audience due to its fast-paced gameplay and advanced graphics. The game's audio was implemented using an interactive music system called "Cybersound Music System".

A CD-ROM version titled "Jazz Jackrabbit CD" was released in November 28, 1994, containing all six original episodes, as well as 3 additional ones known as "The Lost Episodes" listed as episodes A, B, and C. In episode C, there is a secret level with Jazz in the form of a lizard.

A shareware Christmas edition titled Jazz Jackrabbit: Holiday Hare 1994 was released on December 15, 1994, with a special 3-level holiday-themed episode. Subsequent pressings of the CD-ROM edition added Holiday Hare as episode X, bringing the total episode count to 10.

Another shareware Christmas edition titled Jazz Jackrabbit: Holiday Hare 1995 was released in November 17, 1995 with a different holiday episode with 2 new holiday-themed worlds.

Legacy
A sequel named Jazz Jackrabbit 2 was released in 1998, as well as a reboot on Game Boy Advance in 2002.  The commercial success of the game kickstarted the career of its co-creator, Cliff Bleszinski, who would later be a key force behind Epic Games' Unreal and Gears of War''.

References

External links
 
 
  (archive)

1994 video games
Run and gun games
Single-player video games
Side-scrolling platform games
Christmas video games
Epic Games games
DOS games
Jazz Jackrabbit
Video games about rabbits and hares
Video games developed in the Netherlands
Video games developed in the United States